The Byzantine Empire was the medieval Eastern Roman empire, that evolved after the fall of the Western Roman Empire in the 5th century.

Byzantine may also refer to:

Byzantine Empire, religion, and culture
Byzantine architecture
 Byzantine Revival architecture, a.k.a. Neo-Byzantine architecture, an historicist or revival style
Byzantine art
Byzantine music
Byzantine literature
Byzantine Greek, or Medieval Greek, the form of the Greek language spoken in the Byzantine Empire during the Middle Ages
Byzantine Rite, an ecclesial rite in the Eastern Catholic Churches and the Eastern Orthodox Church
Byzantine text-type (also called Antiocheian Text, Constantinopolitan Text, Ecclesiastical Text, Majority Text, Syrian Text, or Traditional Text), one of several text-types used in textual criticism to describe the textual character of Greek New Testament manuscripts
List of Byzantine emperors

Arts, entertainment, and media
Byzantine (album)
Byzantine (band), a heavy metal band from West Virginia, United States
Byzantine (video game)

Other uses
Byzantine fault, tolerance in computer science

See also
Byzantines (disambiguation)
Byzantinism, a modern comparison to the complexity of the political apparatus of the Byzantine empire
Byzantium (disambiguation)